The 1805 Tennessee gubernatorial election took place from August 1–2, 1805. Roane attempted to retake the governorship back from Sevier, but was defeated by Sevier who had taken 63.74% of the vote.

Results

References

1805 Tennessee elections
1805
Tennessee